Ochsenheimeria kisilkuma is a moth of the family Ypsolophidae. It is found in the Kyzyl Kum desert in Uzbekistan.

References

Moths described in 1966
Ypsolophidae
Moths of Asia